I Mobster (originally released in the UK as The Mobster) is a 1958 film noir crime-drama film directed by Roger Corman. The film features a cameo of famous burlesque star Lili St. Cyr.

Plot

Joe Sante is a small time crook, who works as a bookie's runner and small time drug pusher. Through ruthlessness and hard work, he begins to climb the ranks of organized crime until he becomes one of the main crime czars in his city. Eventually, he is betrayed and killed by his criminal cohorts who desire his wealth and power.

Cast 
 Steve Cochran as Joe Sante
 Lita Milan as Teresa Porter
 Robert Strauss as Black Frankie 
 Celia Lovsky as Mrs. Sante
 Lili St. Cyr as herself
 John Brinkley as Ernie Porter
 Grant Withers as Paul Moran
 Yvette Vickers as The Blonde
 Frank Gerstle as District Attorney
 Robert Shayne as Senator
 Wally Cassell as Cherry Nose Sirago (adult)
 Jeri Southern as Singer

Production
Filming started 15 July 1958. It was Corman's biggest budgeted production to date. Cochrane was borrowed from Robert Alexander Productions.  Independent film producer Edward L. Alperson brought the screen play to Corman. The screenplay was written by Steve Fisher.

Reception

Variety praised the movie, especially the portrait of the Cochran's rise and fall. The magazine also praised the directing and acting in the movie. The Monthly Film Bulletin found the black humor to elevate the movie over its rather episodic story. CEA Film Report however found the movie offer nothing new or different. Corman thought the film lacked the depth of Machine Gun Kelly.

See also
List of American films of 1959
 List of American films of 1958

References

External links

Review of film at Variety

1958 films
1950s crime drama films
American crime drama films
Films directed by Roger Corman
Films produced by Roger Corman
Films produced by Gene Corman
1958 drama films
1959 drama films
1959 films
American black-and-white films
1950s English-language films
1950s American films